Armand Jung (13 December 1950 – 31 July 2019) was a member of the National Assembly of France.  He represented Bas-Rhin's 1st constituency,  and was a member of the Socialiste, radical, citoyen et divers gauche.

References

1950 births
2019 deaths
People from Moselle (department)
Socialist Party (France) politicians
Bas-Rhin
Deputies of the 12th National Assembly of the French Fifth Republic
Deputies of the 13th National Assembly of the French Fifth Republic
Deputies of the 14th National Assembly of the French Fifth Republic